Parasmermus tonkinensis is a species of beetle in the family Cerambycidae, and the only species in the genus Parasmermus. It was described by Breuning in 1969.

References

Agapanthiini
Beetles described in 1969
Monotypic beetle genera